Beacon Ranch limited is a limited liability company duly registered and carrying business  in the republic of Kenya being registered as proprietor of leases in republic of Kenya's Eastern Province in North west of Athi river trading centre.

References 

Populated places in Eastern Province (Kenya)